The 1545 siege of Takatō castle, Takeda Shingen continuing his sweep through the Ima Valley of Shinano Province, seeking to take control of the entire province, he defeated Takatō Yoritsugu, the castellan.

History 
Takatō had relied on support from his allies, Ogasawara Nagatoki and Tozawa Yorichika, who failed to aid in his defense. This marked the first time Takatō castle had been besieged.

References
Turnbull, Stephen (1998). 'The Samurai Sourcebook'. London: Cassell & Co.

See also
Siege of Takatō (1582)

Takato 1545
Takato 1545
1545 in Japan
Conflicts in 1545